Birdwood is a town in New South Wales, Australia about 1 hour 6 minutes drive south of Port Macquarie.

References 

Towns in New South Wales
Mid North Coast